In statistics, the interdecile range is the difference between the first and the ninth deciles (10% and 90%).  The interdecile range is a measure of statistical dispersion of the values in a set of data, similar to the range and the interquartile range, and can be computed from the (non-parametric) seven-number summary.

Despite its simplicity, the interdecile range of a sample drawn from a normal distribution can be divided by 2.56 to give a reasonably efficient estimator of the standard deviation of a normal distribution.  This is derived from the fact that the lower (respectively upper) decile of a normal distribution with arbitrary variance is equal to the mean minus (respectively, plus) 1.28 times the standard deviation.  

A more efficient estimator is given by instead taking the 7% trimmed range (the difference between the 7th and 93rd percentiles) and dividing by 3 (corresponding to 86% of the data falling within ±1.5 standard deviations of the mean in a normal distribution); this yields an estimator having about 65% efficiency. Analogous measures of location are given by the median, midhinge, and trimean (or statistics based on nearby points).

See also
Interquartile range
Robust measures of scale
Standard deviation
Statistical analysis

References

Scale statistics